The first neuroimaging technique ever is the so-called 'human circulation balance' invented by Angelo Mosso in the 1880s and able to non-invasively measure the redistribution of blood during emotional and intellectual activity. 
Then, in the early 1900s, a technique called pneumoencephalography was set.  This process involved draining the cerebrospinal fluid from around the brain and replacing it with air, altering the relative density of the brain and its surroundings, to cause it to show up better on an x-ray, and it was considered to be incredibly unsafe for patients (Beaumont 8).  A form of magnetic resonance imaging (MRI) and computed tomography (CT) were developed in the 1970s and 1980s. The new MRI and CT technologies were considerably less harmful and are explained in greater detail below.  Next came SPECT and PET scans, which allowed scientists to map brain function because, unlike MRI and CT, these scans could create more than just static images of the brain's structure.  Learning from MRI, PET and SPECT scanning, scientists were able to develop functional MRI (fMRI) with abilities that opened the door to direct observation of cognitive activities.

Angelo Mosso and his "human circulation balance"
The desire to understand the human mind has been one of the main desires of philosophers throughout the ages. Questions about thoughts, desires, et cetera have drawn psychologists, computer scientists, philosophers, sociologists and the like together into the new discipline of cognitive science.  Non-invasive imaging of the human brain has proven invaluable in this context.

The very first chapter of the history of neuroimaging traces back to the Italian physiologist Angelo Mosso who invented the "human circulation balance", which could non-invasively measure the redistribution of blood during emotional and intellectual activity. However, even if only briefly mentioned by William James in 1890, the details and precise workings of this balance and the experiments Mosso performed with it have remained largely unknown until the recent discovery of the original instrument as well as of Mosso's reports by Stefano Sandrone and colleagues. These documents suggest that patients would be placed on a weighted table that would tilt as blood flowed to their head, for instance, while concentrating on reading a philosophy book. Remarkably, Angelo Mosso unearthed and investigated several critical variables that are still relevant in modern neuroimaging such as the "signal-to-noise ratio", the appropriate choice of the experimental paradigm and the need for the simultaneous recording of differing physiological parameters.

Early uses of brain imaging
However, Mosso's manuscripts have remained largely unknown for more than a century, and therefore it was the structural radiographic techniques to dominate the field of the imaging of the human brain. Unfortunately, because the brain is almost entirely composed of soft tissue that is not radio-opaque, it remains essentially invisible to ordinary or plain x-ray examination. This is also true of most brain abnormalities, though there are exceptions such as a calcified tumor (e.g.meningioma, craniopharyngioma, some types of glioma); whilst calcification in such normal structures as the pineal body, the choroid plexuses, or large brain arteries may indirectly give important clues to the presence of structural disease in the brain itself.

In 1918 the American neurosurgeon Walter Dandy introduced the technique of ventriculography whereby images of the ventricular system within the brain were obtained by injection of filtered air directly into one or both lateral ventricles of the brain via one or more small trephine holes drilled in the skull under local anaesthesia.  Though not usually a painful procedure, ventriculography carried significant risks to the patient under investigation, such as haemorrhage, infection, and dangerous changes in intracranial pressure.  Nevertheless, the surgical information given by this method was often remarkably precise and greatly enlarged the capabilities and accuracy of neurosurgical treatment.  Dandy also observed that air introduced into the subarachnoid space via lumbar spinal puncture could enter the cerebral ventricles and also demonstrate the cerebrospinal fluid compartments around the base of the brain and over its surface.  This technique was called pneumoencephalography.  It further extended the scope for precise intracranial diagnosis, but at a similar cost of risks to the patient as well as being, in itself, a most unpleasant and often painful ordeal.

Development of modern techniques
In 1927 Egas Moniz, professor of neurology in Lisbon and Nobel Prize in Physiology or Medicine winner in 1949, introduced cerebral angiography, whereby both normal and abnormal blood vessels in and around the brain could be visualized with great accuracy.  In its early days this technique likewise carried both immediate and long-term risks, many of them referable to deleterious effects of the positive-contrast substances that were used for injection into the circulation.  Techniques have become very refined in the past few decades, with one in 200 patients or less experiencing ischemic sequelae from the procedure. As a result, cerebral angiography remains an essential part of the neurosurgeon's diagnostic imaging armamentarium and, increasingly, of the therapeutic armamentarium as well, in the neurointerventional management of cerebral aneurysms and other blood-vessel lesions and in some varieties of brain tumor.

Computerized tomography 
With the advent of computerized axial tomography (CAT or CT scanning), ever more detailed anatomic images of the brain became available for diagnostic and research purposes.  The names of William H. Oldendorf (in 1961) Godfrey Newbold Hounsfield and Allan McLeod Cormack (in 1973) are associated with this revolutionary innovation, which enabled much easier, safer, non-invasive, painless and (to a reasonable extent) repeatable neuro-investigation. Cormack and Hounsfield won the Nobel Prize in Physiology or Medicine in 1979 for this work.

Radioactive neuroimaging 
Early techniques such as xenon inhalation provided the first blood flow maps of the brain. 
Developed in the early 1960s by Niels A. Lassen, David H. Ingvar and Erik Skinhøj in southern Scandinavia it used the isotope xenon-133. Later versions would have 254 scintillators so a two-dimensional image could be produced on a color monitor. It allowed them to construct images reflecting brain activation from speaking, reading, visual or auditory perception and voluntary movement.
The technique was also used to investigate, e.g., imagined sequential movements, mental calculation and mental spatial navigation.

Soon after the invention of CAT, the development of radioligands started the functional imaging revolution. Radioligands either remain within the blood stream or enter the brain and bind to receptors. Radioligands are either single photon or positron emitters. This is how single photon emission computed tomography (SPECT) and positron emission tomography (PET) got their names. While the first human positron imaging device was developed by Gordon Brownell and William Sweet in the 1950s, Michel Ter-Pogossian, Edward J. Hoffman and Michael Phelps developed the first human PET scanner in 1973 with hexagonal detectors.

After the work Marcus Raichle and coworkers, functional imaging took a large step forward with the development of oxygen-15 labelled water (H215O, or H2O-15) imaging.  H2O-15 emits positrons and creates images based on regional blood flow within the brain. Since active neurons recruit a robust blood supply, H2O-15 PET allowed investigators to make regional maps of brain activity during various cognitive tasks. Later, a more common sort of functional imaging based on PET scans used FDG, a positron-emitting sugar-derivative which is distributed in the brain according to local metabolic activity. Unlike the short half-life of oxygen-15 (2.25 minutes), the 110 minute half-life of FDG allowed PET scans by machines physically distant from the cyclotron producing the isotope (in this case fluorine-18).

Magnetic resonance imaging 
Shortly after the initial development of CT, magnetic resonance imaging (MRI or MR scanning) was developed. Rather than using ionizing or X-radiation, MRI uses the variation in signals produced by protons in the body when the head is placed in a strong magnetic field. Associated with early application of the basic technique to the human body are the names of Jackson (in 1968), Damadian (in 1972), and Abe and Paul Lauterbur(in 1973). Lauterbur and Sir Peter Mansfield were awarded the 2003 Nobel Prize in Physiology or Medicine for their discoveries concerning MRI. At first, structural imaging benefited more than functional imaging from the introduction of MRI.  During the 1980s a veritable explosion of technical refinements and diagnostic MR applications took place, enabling even neurological tyros to diagnose brain pathology that would have been elusive or incapable of demonstration in a living person only a decade or two earlier.

Scientists soon learned that the large blood flow changes measured by H2O-15 PET were also imaged by MRI. Functional magnetic resonance imaging (fMRI) was born. Since the 1990s, fMRI has come to dominate the brain mapping field due to its low invasiveness, lack of radiation exposure, and relatively wide availability.

Physicists have also developed other MRI-based techniques such as arterial spin labeling (where arterial blood is magnetically tagged before it enters into the tissue of interest and the amount of labeling is measured and compared to a control recording obtained without spin labeling), magnetic resonance spectroscopy (for measuring some key metabolites such as N-acetylaspartate and lactate within the living brain) and diffusion tensor imaging (for mapping white matter tracts within the living brain).  Whereas structural MRI and CAT scanning have a large place in medicine, fMRI and its brethren techniques are still largely devoted to neuroscience research. However, very recently neurologists have started to use fMRI to begin to answer clinical questions, such as how long after thrombotic stroke is it safe and effective to give clot-dissolving drug like tissue plasminogen activator (TPA). Similarly, PET and SPECT have moved out of neuro-research and are increasingly being used clinically to help diagnose and differentiate types of dementing illnesses (dementia).

Magnetoencephalography 
Magnetoencephalography (MEG) signals were first measured by University of Illinois physicist David Cohen in 1968,. He later used one of the first SQUID detectors, to again measure MEG signals.

Multimodal neuroimaging
Multimodal imaging combines existing brain imaging techniques in synergistic ways which facilitate the improved interpretation of data.

Besides fMRI, another example of technology allowing relatively older brain imaging techniques to be even more helpful is the ability to combine different techniques to get one brain map.  This happens quite frequently with MRI and EEG scans.  The electrical diagram of the EEG provides split-second timing while the MRI provides high levels of spatial accuracy.

The combined use of MEG and functional magnetic resonance imaging was first reported in 1999. It combines the spatial resolution of fMRI with the temporal resolution of the MEG.  Often the non-uniqueness of the MEG source estimation problem (inverse problem) can be alleviated by incorporating information from other imaging modalities as an a priori constraint. Anatomically constrained MEG (aMEG) uses anatomical MRI data as a geometrical or location constraint and as a medium for visualization of MEG results. MEG does not provide structural or anatomical information. Therefore, MEG data is often combined with MR data into a composite image whereby functional information is overlaid on the corresponding anatomy to produce an activation map.

Recent breakthroughs

Recent breakthroughs in non-invasive brain imaging have been somewhat limited because most of them have not been completely novel; rather, they are simply refining existing brain imaging techniques.  fMRI is a perfect example of this from the early 1990s, and it still remains the most popular brain imaging technique available today.

Advances have been made in a number of ways regarding neuroimaging, and this section will cover some of the more prominent improvements including computational advances, transcranial magnetic stimulation, and nuclear magnetic resonance.

To begin with, much of the recent progress has had to do not with the actual brain imaging methods themselves but with our ability to utilize computers in analyzing the data. For example, substantial discoveries in the growth of human brains from age three months to the age of fifteen have been made due to the creation of high-resolution brain maps and computer technology to analyze these maps over various periods of time and growth (Thompson, UCLA). This type of breakthrough represents the nature of most breakthroughs in neuroscience today. With fMRI technology mapping brains beyond what we are already understanding, most innovators time is being spent trying to make sense of the data we already have rather than probing into other realms of brain imaging and mapping.

This can be seen more clearly in the fact that brain imaging archives are catching on and neuroinformatics is allowing researchers to examine thousands of brains rather than just a few (Lynch).  Also, these archives are universalizing and standardizing formats and descriptions so that they are more searchable for everyone.  For the past decade we have been able to get data and now our technology allows us to share findings and research much easier.  This has also allowed for "brain atlases" to be made. Brain maps are simply maps of what normal functioning brains look like (Thompson, Bioinformatics).

Transcranial magnetic stimulation (TMS) is a recent innovation in brain imaging.  In TMS, a coil is held near a person's head to generate magnetic field impulses that stimulate underlying brain cells to make someone perform a specific action.  Using this in combination with MRI, the researcher can generate maps of the brain performing very specific functions. Instead of asking a patient to tap his or her finger, the TMS coil can simply "tell" his or her brain to tap his or her finger.  This eliminates many of the false positives received from traditional MRI and fMRI testing.  The images received from this technology are slightly different from the typical MRI results, and they can be used to map any subject's brain by monitoring up to 120 different stimulations.  This technology has been used to map both motor processes and visual processes (Potts link at bottom of TMS). In addition to fMRI, the activation of TMS can be measured using electroencephalography (EEG) or near infrared spectroscopy (NIRS).

Nuclear magnetic resonance (NMR) is what MRI and fMRI technologies were derived from, but recent advances have been made by going back to the original NMR technology and revamping some of its aspects.  NMR traditionally has two steps, signal encoding and detection, and these steps are normally carried out in the same instrument.  The new discovery, however, suggests that using laser-polarized xenon gas for "remembering" encoded information and transporting that information to a remote detection site could prove far more effective (Preuss).  Separating the encoding and detection allows researchers to gain data about chemical, physical, and biological processes that they have been unable to gain until now.  The result allows researchers to map things as big as geological core samples or as small as single cells. 

It is interesting to see how advances are split between those seeking a completely mapped brain by utilizing single neuron imaging and those utilizing images of brains as subjects perform various high-level tasks.  Single neuron imaging (SNI) uses a combination of genetic engineering and optical imaging techniques to insert tiny electrodes into the brain for the purpose of measuring a single neuron's firing.  Due to its damaging repercussions, this technique has only been used on animals, but it has shed a lot of light on basic emotional and motivational processes.  The goal of studies in higher-level activities is to determine how a network of brain areas collaborates to perform each task.  This higher-level imaging is much easier to do because researchers can easily use subjects who have a disease such as Alzheimer's.  The SNI technology seems to be going after the possibility for AI while the network-probing technology seems to be more for medical purposes.

References
 Ball, Philip.  "Brain Imaging Explained."  Online at http://www.nature.com/nsu/010712/010712-13.html
 
 Beaumont, J. Graham.  Introduction to Neuropsychology.  New York:  The Guilford Press, 1983.  314 pages.
 Changeux, Jean-Pierre.  Neuronal Man:  The Biology of Mind.  New York:  Oxford University Press, 1985.  348 pages.
 Donoghue, John P.  "Connecting Cortex to Machines:  Recent Advance in Brain Interfaces."  Online at http://www.nature.com/cgi-taf/DynaPage.taf?file=/neuro/journal/v5/n11s/full/nn947.html
 Hook, C. Christopher.  "The Techno Sapiens are Coming."  Online at www.Christianitytoday.com/ct/2004/001/1.36.html
 Jeeves, Malcolm.  Mind Fields:  Reflections on the Science of Mind and Brain.  Grand Rapids, MI:  Baker Books, 1994.  141 pages.
 Johnson, Keith A.  "Neuroimaging Primer."  Online at http://www.med.harvard.edu/AANLIB/hms1.html
 Leventon, Michael.  "Transcranial Magnetic Stimulation."  In association with MIT AI Lab.  Online at http://www.ai.mit.edu/projects/medical-vision/surgery/tms.html
 Lister, Richard G. and Herbert J. Weingartner.  Perspectives on Cognitive Neuroscience.  New York:  Oxford University Press, 1991.  508 pages.
 Mattson, James and Merrill Simon.   The Pioneers of NMR and Magnetic Resonance in Medicine.  United States:  Dean Books Company, 1996.  838 pages.
 Nilsson, Lars-Goran and Hans J. Markowitsch.  Cognitive Neuroscience of Memory.  Seattle:  Hogrefe & Huber Publishers, 1999.  307 pages.
 Norman, Donald A.  Perspectives on Cognitive Science.  New Jersey:  Ablex Publishing Corporation, 1981.  303 pages.
 
 Preuss, Paul.  "Detection at a Distance for More Sensitive MRI."  Online at http://www.lbl.gov/Science-Articles/Archive/MSD-remote-detection-MRI.html
 Rapp, Brenda.  The Handbook of Cognitive Neuropsychology.  Ann Arbor, MI:  Psychology Press, 2001.  652 pages.
 Romain, Gabe.  "Brain Imaging Breakthrough for Alzheimer s."  Last edited 1/23/2004.  Online at https://web.archive.org/web/20041208120231/http://www.betterhumans.com/News/news.aspx?articleID=2004-01-23-4
 Schulder, Michael.  "Functional Image-Guided Surgery for Brain Tumors."  Online at http://www.virtualtrials.com/Schulder.cfm
 Sheffield Hallam University, School of Science and Mathematics.  "Nuclear Magnetic Resonance Spectroscopy."  Online at http://www.shu.ac.uk/schools/sci/chem/tutorials/molspec/nmr1.htm
 Shorey, Jamie.  "Foundations of fMRI."  Online at https://web.archive.org/web/20041209175202/http://www.ee.duke.edu/~jshorey/MRIHomepage/MRImain.html
 Swiercinsky, Dennis P.  "Brain Forensics." Last edited 7/11/01.  Online at https://web.archive.org/web/20041208062245/http://www.brainsource.com/brainforensics.htm
 Thompson, Paul.  "UCLA Researchers Map Brain Growth in Four Dimensions, Revealing Stage-Specific Growth Patterns in Children."  Online at https://web.archive.org/web/20041204085436/http://www.loni.ucla.edu/~thompson/MEDIA/press_release.html and https://web.archive.org/web/20041204083259/http://www.loni.ucla.edu/~thompson/JAY/Growth_REVISED.html
 Thompson, Paul M.  "Bioinformatics and Brain Imaging:  Recent Advances and Neuroscience Applications."  Online at https://web.archive.org/web/20050118095748/http://www.loni.ucla.edu/~thompson/SFN2002/SFN2002coursePT_v4.pdf
 Zwillich, Todd.  "Brain Scan Technology Poised to Play Policy Roll."  Online at https://web.archive.org/web/20041204084542/http://www.loni.ucla.edu/~thompson/MEDIA/RH/rh.html

Notes 

Neuro
Neuroimaging
Neuroimaging